The 1983 Bakersfield Open, also known as the Ginny of Bakersfield,  was a women's tennis tournament played on outdoor hard courts in Bakersfield, California that was part of the Ginny Tournament Circuit of the 1983 Virginia Slims World Championship Series. It was the inaugural edition of the tournament and was held from September 26 through October 2, 1983. Jennifer Mundel-Reinbold  won the singles title.

Finals

Singles
 Jennifer Mundel-Reinbold defeated  Julie Harrington 6–4, 6–1
 It was Mundel-Reinbold's only career title.

Doubles
 Kyle Copeland /  Lori McNeil defeated  Ann Henricksson /  Pat Medrado 6–4, 6–3
 It was Copeland's only career title. It was McNeil's 1st career title.

Point distribution
The following Virginia Slims ranking points were available for the tournament.

Notes

References

External links
 Tournament fact sheet

Bakersfield Open
Tennis tournaments in the United States
1983 in American tennis